Qingfei Yihuo Wan is a yellowish-brown honeyed pill used in Traditional Chinese medicine to "remove heat from the lungs, relieve cough, resolve phlegm and relax the bowels". It has a slight odor, and tastes bitter. It is used where there is "heat in the lung marked by cough, yellowish sticky phlegm, dryness of the mouth, sore throat and constipation".

Chinese classic herbal formula of Qingfei Yihuo Wan

See also
 Chinese classic herbal formula
 Bu Zhong Yi Qi Wan

References

Traditional Chinese medicine pills